is the fifth solo studio album by Japanese hip hop producer DJ Krush. It was released in 1998. It peaked at number 95 on the Oricon Albums Chart.

Critical reception

Ned Raggett of AllMusic gave the album 4.5 stars out of 5, calling it "another invigorating, moody, and powerful release." Dave Segal of The Stranger said, "Krush certainly isn't the first producer to apply minimalism to hiphop, but unlike nearly every other work in the art form, Kakusei seems to exist in a hermetic world, a stark temple of funk."

In 2014, Metro Weekly included it on the "20 Great Stoner Albums" list.

Track listing

Charts

References

External links
 

1998 albums
DJ Krush albums